Petr Janda (born 5 January 1975) is a Czech architect. He studied at the Czech Technical University in Prague (1993–2001) and is also a graduate of the Monumental Art Studio of Professor Aleš Veselý at the Academy of Fine Arts (1997–2003).

He started to work with A 69 Architects, later he was one of the founding members of sporadical art studio. Since March 2008 he has run his own brainwork art studio. In 2011 he became a member of the board of the Czech Chamber of Architects.

In 2020 and 2021, Petr Janda was nominated for the Architect of the Year Award in the Czech Republic.

Works 

 Memorial to the floods, Otrokovice (1998) 
 Memorial to the victims of communism, Liberec(2006) 
 Lazyhouse, Zlín (2007–2020)
 Flowhouse, Tečovice (2008–)
 Golf Academy Olomouc (2010–)
 (A)VOID Floating - floating pavilion, Prague (2011–)
 Revitalization of Prague riverfront area (2009–2019)

Awards 

Awards for the Revitalization of Prague riverfront area:
 Architecture Master Prize 2020 – Best of the best, Restoration and renovation
 BigSEE Architecture Award 2020 – Grand prix, Public and commercial Architecture
 Grand Prix architektů 2020 – Czech National Prize for Architecture 
 Building of the year 2020 – The prize of the mayor of Prague
 German Design Awards 2021 – Special Mention
 Iconic Award 2020 – Best of the best
 Archdaily Award 2020 - finalist
 Architizer A+Award 2021 - Special mention
 BigMat Award 2021 - National Prize 
 Dezeen Award 2021 – finalist
 Mies van der Rohe Award 2022 – nomination of the Czech Republic
 Piranesi Award 2021 – finalist

 Floating pool for Prague's riverfront
 Architizer A+Award 2021 – winner of Sports & recreation category, unbuilt project
 European Property Awards 2021 

 2021 European Property Awards - winner of Architecture Single Residence Category, Czech Republic - Lazyhouse, Zlín, Czech republic
 2020 Winner of the call for the design of Flamingo visitor center in Abu Dhabi
 2013 National Prize BigMat 2013 (BigMat ’13 International Architecture Award) – Memorial to the victims of communism, Liberec 
 2013 - 2nd–3rd Prize – Roman Catholic Church of Christ the Redeemer, Prague 
 2009 - 1st Prize Aboard city 2 Botel, Smíchov, Prague 
 2007 - 1st Prize Aboard city 1 Botel, Vyšehrad, Prague 
 2007 - National Architecture Award (Grand Prix architektů) - Memorial to the victims of communism, Liberec
 2007 - 2nd Prize, Nikola Tesla Memorial, Prague 
 2000 - 3rd Prize, Memorial to the victims of the totalitarian regime, Prague 
 1999 - 2nd Prize, Jan Palach and Jan Zajíc Memorial, Wenceslas Square, Prague

References

External links 
 Petr Janda and (A)VOID Gallery bring Art to Prague´s Waterfront Walls, core77.com, 21. 9. 2011

1975 births
Living people
20th-century Czech architects
21st-century architects
People from Zlín